The Women's Individual Pursuit B track cycling event at the 2012 Summer Paralympics took place on September 2 at London Velopark. This class was for blind and visually impaired cyclists riding with a sighted pilot. Eleven pairs from nine different nations competed.

The competition began with five head to head races and one unpaired ride between the eleven riders. These races were held over a 3000m course and each rider was given a time for their race. The fastest two riders were advanced to the gold medal final whilst the third and fourth fastest times raced it out for the bronze.

Preliminaries
WR = World Record

Finals 
Gold medal match

Bronze medal match

References

Women's pursuit B
2012 in women's road cycling